Colla aminula is a moth in the family Bombycidae. It was described by Herbert Druce in 1890. It is found in Uruguay.

References

Bombycidae
Moths described in 1890